Millicent Maxine Edwards (August 24, 1928 – August 26, 1998) was an American actress who performed on stage, in films, and on television.

Early years 
She was born Millicent Maxine Edwards in Jackson Heights, Queens, New York. After moving to Florida, she graduated from Miami Edison High School.

Career 
When she was 12 years old, Edwards danced in Let's Face It, and at the age of 14, she appeared on Broadway as a dancer in Ziegfeld Follies of 1943. Her other Broadway credits include Laffing Room Only (1944) and The Duchess Misbehaves (1946).

Edwards' film debut came in My Wild Irish Rose (1947). She also appeared in the films Trail of Robin Hood, Spoilers of the Plains, Heart of the Rockies, In Old Amarillo, North of the Great Divide, Sunset in the West, Street Bandits, and Missing Women, among others.

In the late 1940s, Edwards toured the United States for 14 months, performing in vaudeville.

Public response to Edwards' appearance with Roy Rogers in Sunset in the West (1950) led to her receiving a long-term contract with Republic Pictures.

In the 1950s, Edwards appeared on television in Westerns and mystery programs. Edwards appeared as Nan Gable in the 1958 episode, "Two-Gun Nan", on the syndicated television anthology series, Death Valley Days.

In 1954, Edwards announced her retirement from acting "to do the Lord's work in whatever way He wills." She and her husband, Ralph Winters, planned to join the Seventh-day Adventist Church. In 1956, though, she appeared as Molly Crowley in the TV Western series Cheyenne in the episode titled "Johnny Bravo" that was released as a feature film called The Travelers. She acted as a guest star on various American television series until 1961.

Personal life and death 
Edwards was divorced from Ralph H. Winters and Jerry Friedman. She had a son and two daughters, one of whom is actress Deborah Winters. Edwards died of lung cancer on August 26, 1998, in Friendswood, Texas, at the age of 70.

Partial filmography

1948: Feudin', Fussin' and A-Fightin'
1948: Two Guys from Texas
1949: Tucson
1950: Trail of Robin Hood
1950: North of the Great Divide
1950: Sunset in the West
1951: Heart of the Rockies
1951: In Old Amarillo
1951: Million Dollar Pursuit
1951: Missing Women
1951: Spoilers of the Plains
1951: Street Bandits
1951: Utah Wagon Train
1951: The Wild Blue Yonder 
1952: Captive of Billy the Kid
1952: Pony Soldier
1952: Woman in the Dark
1953: Powder River
1957: The Dalton Girls
1957: The Restless Gun Episode "Thicker Than Water"
1957: Ride a Violent Mile
1957: The Travellers (feature film compilation of two episodes of Cheyenne

References

External links
 

1928 births
1998 deaths
20th-century American actresses
American film actresses
Deaths from cancer in Texas
American stage actresses
Broadway theatre people
Vaudeville performers
Western (genre) film actresses
Western (genre) television actors